Alex Sinclair (27 July 1882 – 12 July 1969) was a Canadian rower. He competed in the men's eight event at the 1912 Summer Olympics.

References

External links
 
 

1882 births
1969 deaths
Canadian male rowers
Olympic rowers of Canada
Rowers at the 1912 Summer Olympics
Sportspeople from Fort Erie, Ontario